The University Hospital of Zürich (USZ) is one of five university hospitals in Switzerland.

The first hospital in Zürich, from which the current hospital derives, is recorded as having existed as early as 1204. The name, location and buildings have since changed many times. , the hospital employs an approximate staff of 8,000 (1,200 doctors, 2,400 care professionals, 980 medical-technical and medical-therapeutic specialists) providing medical care to 134,000 ambulant and over 35,000 stationary patients each year in 42 clinics.

Scientists and physicians of international renown who have practiced at the hospital include Ferdinand Sauerbruch, Andreas Grüntzig and Rolf M. Zinkernagel; the latter received a Nobel Prize for research done at the hospital.

See also 
 University of Zürich

References

External links 

 

1204 establishments in Europe
Healthcare in Zürich
Hospitals established in the 13th century
Zürich
Hochschulen